Geoffrey John Hignett (born 1950), is a male former athlete who competed for England.

Athletics career
Hignett was the 1973 English long jump champion.

He represented England in the long jump, at the 1970 British Commonwealth Games in Edinburgh, Scotland.

He also competed at the 1971 European Athletics Championships in Helsinki and won a bronze medal at the Universiade.

References

1950 births
English male long jumpers
Athletes (track and field) at the 1970 British Commonwealth Games
Living people
Commonwealth Games competitors for England
Universiade medalists in athletics (track and field)
Universiade bronze medalists for Great Britain